Boronia pulchella, commonly known as the pink boronia, is a plant in the citrus family Rutaceae, and is endemic to a small area in the south-west of Western Australia. It is a slender shrub with rod-like stems, pinnate leaves and deep pink, four-petalled flowers.

Description
The leaves are compound with an odd number of leaflets between three and fifteen. The ten stamens have a few soft hairs and those near the sepals have a prominent swelling on the top. Flowering occurs from September to November.

Taxonomy and naming
Boronia pulchella was first formally described in 1852 by Nikolai Turczaninow and the description was published in Bulletin de la Société Impériale des Naturalistes de Moscou. The specific epithet (pulchella) is the diminutive form of the Latin word pulcher meaning "pretty", hence "pretty little".

Distribution and habitat
Pink boronia grows in stony and sandy soils on rock outcrops, in gullies and along watercourses in the Esperance Plains biogeographic region, especially in the Stirling and Porongorup Ranges.

Conservation
Boronia pulchella is classified as "not threatened" by the Western Australian Government Department of Parks and Wildlife.

References

pulchella
Flora of Western Australia
Plants described in 1852
Taxa named by Nikolai Turczaninow